Kummerowia is a genus of flowering plants in the legume family, Fabaceae. It belongs to the subfamily Faboideae. These plants were formerly in genus Lespedeza.

Species:
Kummerowia stipulacea - Korean bushclover
Kummerowia striata - Japanese bushclover

References

Desmodieae
Fabaceae genera